Bhanu Chowk is a locality in Dharan, Sunsari, Eastern Nepal.

Populated places in Sunsari District